Gunab may refer to:
 Gunab, Kermanshah
 Gunab, Markazi